The Lynn Fighting Knights are the athletic teams that represent Lynn University, located in Boca Raton, Florida, in NCAA Division II intercollegiate sports. The Fighting Knights compete as members of the Sunshine State Conference for all 14 varsity sports. Lynn has been a member of the SSC since 1997.

Varsity teams
Lynn University added men's lacrosse for the 2014 season. The sport was the third addition in recent years, after the university added women's cross country and swimming in 2012.

Men's sports (9)
Baseball
Basketball
Cross country
Golf
Lacrosse
Soccer
Swimming
Tennis
Track (distance)

Women's sports (10)
Basketball
Cross country
Golf
Lacrosse
Soccer
Softball
Swimming
Tennis
Track (distance)
Volleyball

National championships
Lynn University teams have won a total of 22 NCAA and NAIA national championships, and 30 Sunshine State Conference championships.

Team

Notable athletes

 Jean AlexandreMidfielder, San Jose Earthquakes
 Tal ErelBaseball catcher for the Israel national baseball team
 Scott GordonDefender, Fort Lauderdale Strikers
 Svetlana Gounkina Russian golfer; multiple Russian national champion; bronze medalist in the World Golfers Championship
 Tommy KahnlePitcher for the New York Yankees
 Tim MeliaGoalkeeper, Sporting Kansas City
 Jared MontzFormer Defender, Chicago Fire, and founder of Online Soccer Academy
Melissa OrtizFormer player for Colombia's Women's National Soccer Team

NCAA sanctions
On July 17, 2007, NCAA vacated Lynn's 2005 Women's Division II Softball Championship due to extra benefits given to two players.  The NCAA found that former coach Thomas Macera gave two Lynn softball players cash payments totaling more than $3,000.  Lynn was also placed on probation for two years.

References

External links
 Official website of Lynn Fighting Knights Athletics